Ornithuroscincus is a genus of skinks, lizards in the family Scincidae. All but one species are endemic to New Guinea: in addition to northern New Guinea, Ornithuroscincus noctua occurs on many Pacific islands.

Taxonomy
The genus Ornithuroscincus was erected in 2021 in the revision of the then-polyphyletic genus Lobulia. Its closest relative in Alpinoscincus.

Description
The limbs are short. They are ovoviviparous with 1–3 offspring in each litter.

Habitat
They are terrestrial to semi-arboreal. Most species have restricted ranges in mountainous areas, but some species are widespread and occur in lowland areas.

Species
The following species are recognized as being valid:
Ornithuroscincus albodorsalis 
Ornithuroscincus bengaun 
Ornithuroscincus inornatus 
Ornithuroscincus noctua  – moth skink
Ornithuroscincus nototaenia 
Ornithuroscincus pterophilus 
Ornithuroscincus sabini 
Ornithuroscincus shearmani 
Ornithuroscincus viridis 

Nota bene: A binomial authority in parentheses indicates that the species was originally described in a genus other than Ornithuroscincus.

References

Ornithuroscincus
Lizard genera
Taxa named by Allen Allison
Taxa named by Salvador Carranza
Taxa named by Edward Frederick Kraus